Bad Kötzting (before 2005: Kötzting; Northern Bavarian: Bad Ketzing) is a town in the district of Cham, in Bavaria, Germany, near the Czech border.

Overview
Bad Kötzting has the charming character of a small town and offers quite a variety of attractions for tourists.
The locals pride themselves with having one of the largest mounted religious processions in the world, the "Kötztinger Pfingstritt".
The local priest was unable to comply with the wishes of the man because he needed protection from bears, wolves, and other dangers luring along the way. After asking the young men of the village to protect him, they accompanied the priest to the dying man. After a safe journey, the participants vowed to repeat the ride every year. That is how it remained ever since. Every Whit Monday, the ride of over 900 horses and riders is repeated. The horses wear ornaments and the riders wear traditional Bavarian clothes. The ride starts in Kötzting and goes to the village "Steinbühl", where according to the legend, the man asking for anointment, was dying. Only men from the region are allowed to participate in the procession, the participating horses, however, come from all over Bavaria.
The annual fair is also in town when the procession takes place. A local "Bierzelt" and numerous rides invite the public.

Gallery 
Impressions from the Kötztinger Pfingstritt, 2001

Administrative division 
Bad Kötzting is divided into 51 districts:

 Ammermühle
 Arndorf
 Bachmaierholz
 Bad Kötzting
 Bärndorf
 Beckendorf
 Berghäusl
 Bonried
 Buchberg bei Steinbühl
 Buchberg bei Wettzell
 Dachsenbühl
 Fischerhof
 Gadsdorf
 Gehstorf
 Gradis
 Grub
 Hafenberg
 Haus
 Hausermühle
 Himmelreich
 Hofern
 Höfing
 Hofmannsgütl
 Kaitersbach
 Kammern
 Kieslau
 Klobighof
 Leckern
 Liebenstein
 Ludwigsberg
 Maiberg
 Matzelsdorf
 Niesassen
 Ramsried
 Regenstein
 Reitenberg
 Reitenstein
 Ried am Haidstein
 Ried am See
 Riedersfurt
 Sackenried
 Sperlhammer
 Steinbühl
 Stockmühle
 Traidersdorf
 Waid
 Weißenholz
 Weißenregen
 Wettzell
 Wölkersdorf
 Zeltendorf

There are nine Gemarkungen within the municipality area: Arndorf, Bad Kötzting, Gehstorf, Haus, Liebenstein, Sackenried, Traidersdorf, Weißenregen und Wettzell.

Historical events 

 1085 AD: First public recording of "Chostingen".
1151: Pope Eugenius III confirms privileges and rights of possession to Abbey Rott.
1204: A common court ("Schranne") is established in Kötzting.
 c. 1260: Grant of Market status.
 1344: Emperor Louis IV confirms the market status.
 c. 1425: Continuous attacks by the Hussites.
 1583: Bubonic plague strikes the village and surrounding areas.
 1614: Ownership of land by Abbey Rott is refuted.
 1633: Thirty Years' War (1618–1648): Swedish forces burn down Kötzting.
 1648: Thirty Years' War: Last attack by Swedish forces and repeated outbreak of the plague.
 1770: Widespread starvation throughout the Bavarian Forest.
 1805: Kötzting becomes an independent parish.
 1837: As part of a rezoning measure, Kötzting becomes part of the district of Lower Bavaria.
 1867: Much of the village burns down in a fire covering large parts of the town.
 1953: Kötzting is granted the status of a town.
 1965: A military garrison is established in Kötzting.
 1972: The county of Kötzting is dissolved and the county becomes part of the county of Cham. Hence, Kötzting becomes part of the district of Upper Palatinate.
 1986: Recognition as Climatic Spa.
 1990: Laureate in competition "Gastliches Bayern" (guest friendly Bavaria).
 1992: Opening of the Spa Gardens "Auwiesen".
 1994: Title of "recreational locality" for all parts of the town.
 1995: Recognition as "Garden Spa" in the tradition of Father Sebastian Kneipp.
 2000: Grand Opening of the Casino in Kötzting.
 2002: Expansion of the Spa Gardens "Auwiesen".
 2004: Closure of the Garrison "Hohenbogen".
 2005: Opening of the Open-Air and Adventure Bath ("Bathing world") AQACUR, title of Kneipp-Therapeutic Spa, and change of name to Bad Kötzting.

Mayor
Since 2014: Markus Hofmann (b. 1975)

Twin towns – sister cities

Bad Kötzting is a founding member of the Douzelage, a unique town twinning association of towns across the European Union, including United Kingdom. This active town twinning began in 1991 and there are regular events, such as a produce market from each of the other countries and festivals. Other members of Douzelage are:

 Agros, Cyprus
 Altea, Spain
 Asikkala, Finland
 Bellagio, Italy
 Bundoran, Ireland
 Chojna, Poland
 Granville, France
 Holstebro, Denmark
 Houffalize, Belgium
 Judenburg, Austria
 Kőszeg, Hungary
 Marsaskala, Malta
 Meerssen, Netherlands
 Niederanven, Luxembourg
 Oxelösund, Sweden
 Preveza, Greece
 Rokiškis, Lithuania
 Rovinj, Croatia
 Sesimbra, Portugal
 Sherborne, United Kingdom
 Sigulda, Latvia
 Siret, Romania
 Škofja Loka, Slovenia
 Sušice, Czech Republic
 Tryavna, Bulgaria
 Türi, Estonia
 Zvolen, Slovakia

Notable people 
 Benedict Stattler (1728–1797), Catholic theologian of the enlightenment
 Anton Schwarz (1858–1931), composer and music teacher
 Helmut Brunner (politician) (born 1954), politician (CSU) and Bavarian minister
 Thomas Dworzak (born 1972), photographer
 Matthias Aschenbrenner (born 1972), mathematician

See also 
 Geodetic Observatory Wettzell

References

Cham (district)
Spa towns in Germany